Jeff Smith (born 26 January 1963) is a British Labour Party politician serving as the Member of Parliament (MP) for Manchester Withington since 2015, and the Shadow Minister for Sport, Tourism, Heritage and Music since 4 December 2021. A former Manchester City Councillor, he served as a senior opposition whip in Parliament from 2015 to 2021, and Shadow Minister for Local Government from May to 4 December 2021.

Early life and career
Smith was a pupil at the private Manchester Grammar School, and graduated from the University of Manchester with a degree in Politics and Economics in 1984. He was a member of the University of Manchester Students' Union Executive from 1984 to 1985 as the Entertainments Officer.

A former councillor for Old Moat ward on Manchester City Council from 1997, he served as the Executive Member for Finance on the council and was a governor at Parrs Wood High School.

Parliamentary career
Smith was selected as the Labour Party candidate for the Manchester Withington constituency in June 2013, ahead of Angela Rayner and fellow Manchester councillor Andrew Simcock. At the general election in May 2015, Smith was elected, defeating the incumbent MP, Liberal Democrat John Leech, with a majority of 14,873.

Smith served as a senior Opposition whip from 2015 to 2021. He supported Owen Smith in the 2016 Labour Party leadership election.

In July 2015, Jeff Smith voted to prevent the government's Welfare Bill going through on the second reading, and voted against it at the third reading.

Smith campaigned to remain in the European Union. In January 2017, he voted against triggering Article 50. On 14 March 2019, Smith voted to reject the then prime minister Theresa May's Brexit deal and a no-deal Brexit.

Smith was re-elected at the 2017 snap general election, securing 71.7% of the vote and more than doubling his majority over John Leech, re-contesting the seat, to 29,875 (55.8%).

Smith is Chair of the All-Party Parliamentary Group on Mental Health, and sits on the advisory board of the Money and Mental Health Policy Institute. He is Vice Chair of the All-Party Parliamentary Humanist Group.

Smith co-founded the Labour Campaign for Drug Policy Reform with Thangam Debbonaire, and is Co-Chair of the All-Party Parliamentary Group on Drug Policy Reform. On 20 April 2020, Smith appeared in a virtual online 4/20 event hosted by Voltfacehub, where he spoke in favour of the decriminalisation and regulation of the drug cannabis.

Smith was appointed as the Shadow Minister for Local Government in the May 2021 Labour reshuffle, filling the position made vacant following Kate Hollern's resignation.
Smith was appointed Shadow Minister for Sport, Tourism, Heritage and Music on 4 December in the Shadow Culture department.

Personal life
Smith's mother was born in Dublin. His grandfather, Jack McDermott, was an Irish trade unionist who brought his family to Manchester when he was elected general secretary of the Amalgamated Society of Woodworkers.

Smith's Jewish great-grandmother, Rosa Simonson, came to Manchester in the 1880s to escape antisemitic persecution in what is now Poland.

Before being elected, Smith was an event manager and DJ, and has performed regularly at V Festival and club nights Poptastic in Manchester and Star in Leeds.

References

External links

1963 births
Living people
People educated at Manchester Grammar School
Alumni of the University of Manchester
Councillors in Manchester
Labour Party (UK) councillors
Labour Party (UK) MPs for English constituencies
English people of Jewish descent
UK MPs 2015–2017
UK MPs 2017–2019
UK MPs 2019–present
British drug policy reform activists
English atheists
English humanists